Yvette Donna Higgins  (born 5 January 1978 in Sydney) is an Australian water polo player from the gold medal squad of the 2000 Summer Olympics. Higgins scored the winning goal during the gold medal game with 1.3 seconds left on the clock.

She played in Italy from 2000 to 2002, before retiring from competition. Since 2002 she has been the coach of the Sydney University first grade women's team.

See also
 Australia women's Olympic water polo team records and statistics
 List of Olympic champions in women's water polo
 List of Olympic medalists in water polo (women)
 List of World Aquatics Championships medalists in water polo

References

External links
 

1978 births
Living people
Australian female water polo players
Olympic gold medalists for Australia in water polo
Water polo players at the 2000 Summer Olympics
Sportswomen from New South Wales
Water polo players from Sydney
Medalists at the 2000 Summer Olympics
Recipients of the Medal of the Order of Australia
Recipients of the Australian Sports Medal
20th-century Australian women
21st-century Australian women
Australian expatriate sportspeople in Italy
Expatriate water polo players
Australian water polo coaches
University of Sydney people